This is a full list of episodes from the Playhouse Disney/Disney Junior original series, Mickey Mouse Clubhouse.
Season 1 has the Mousekedoer song's original lyrics. Seasons 2-4 have the Mousekedoer song's new lyrics heard in Disney-MGM Studios before it became Disney's Hollywood Studios and the one in Playhouse Disney Live on Tour. In the beginning of season three Disney announced that Mickey Mouse Clubhouse was renewed for a fourth season, set to air on Disney Junior in the summer of 2012. Season 4 contains 26 episodes. According to Bill Farmer, the voice actor for Goofy and Pluto, the recording of dialogue for new episodes has ceased.

Series overview

Episodes

Pilot (2005)

Season 1 (2006–07)

Season 2 (2008–10)

Season 3 (2010–12)
This is the final season that Wayne Allwine voices Mickey Mouse.

Season 4 (2012–16)
After Wayne Allwine's death, Bret Iwan takes over the voice of Mickey Mouse.

Short series

Mickey's Mousekersize
Mickey's Mousekersize is a short series. It premiered on February 14, 2011. Characters that are featured in the short series are Mickey Mouse, Minnie Mouse, Donald Duck, Goofy, Pluto, and Toodles. The series consists of ten episodes. In addition to airing in the United States, the short series aired in the United Kingdom and France.

Mickey's World Record Animals [2011-2014]
Mickey's World Record Animals follows Mickey finding the record-setter in different fields. Mickey Mouse's voice with the new Mickey voice actor. Each episode is approximately 2 minutes long.

Where's Pluto
Animated shorts of approx 1–2 minutes long, similar to Where's Waldo.

Home media releases
The following are the DVD releases for Mickey Mouse Clubhouse with episodes included and availability.  All DVD releases are distributed by Walt Disney Studios Home Entertainment.

Region 1 America

Region 2 UK

Notes

References

Mickey Mouse Clubhouse